Myall River, an open semi-mature brackish freshwater barrier estuary of the Mid-Coast Council system, is located in the Mid North Coast region of New South Wales, Australia.

Course and features
Myall River rises out of the southern slopes of Kyle Range within the Great Dividing Range, north northeast of Stroud, and flows generally south southeast then southwest, joined by tributaries, before reaching its mouth within Port Stephens at Hawks Nest. Port Stephens then empties into the Tasman Sea of the South Pacific Ocean. The river descends  over its  course.

After flowing past the town of Bulahdelah, east of the small settlement of Nerong, the Myall River enters the most southern of the three Ramsar-protected Myall Lakes, Bombah Broadwater, within the Myall Lakes National Park. The flow of the river runs adjacent to the coastline and through both the Little Brasswater and the Brasswater near the towns of Tea Gardens, and Hawks Nest.

Two notable bridges cross the Myall River. The Bulahdelah Bridge, carries the Pacific Highway, across the river north of Bulahdelah and the Singing Bridge crosses the river between Tea Gardens and Hawks Nest..

Etymology
The word myall is an Australian Aboriginal term for a small silver-grey wattle tree.

See also 

 Rivers of New South Wales
 List of rivers of New South Wales (L–Z)
 List of rivers of Australia

References

External links
 

Rivers of New South Wales
Mid-Coast Council
Mid North Coast
Rivers of the Hunter Region